23rd district of Czech Senate consists primarily of Prague 8. The current senator representing the district is Lukáš Wagenknecht.

Senators

Elections

1996

2000

2006

2012

References

25
Prague 8
Elections in Prague